Ariane Louis-Seize is a Canadian film director and screenwriter from Quebec. She is most noted for her short films Wild Skin (La Peau sauvage), which was a Canadian Screen Award nominee for Best Live Action Short Drama at the 5th Canadian Screen Awards and a Prix Iris nominee for Best Short Film at the 19th Quebec Cinema Awards, and Little Waves (Les petites vagues), which was named to the Toronto International Film Festival's annual Canada's Top Ten list in 2018.

Her short film The Depths (Les profondeurs) premiered at the 2019 Toronto International Film Festival. It was subsequently screened at the Cinéfest Sudbury International Film Festival, where it won the Audience Choice Award for Best Short Film. She followed up in 2020 with Shooting Star (Comme une comète).

Her debut feature film, Vampire humaniste cherche suicidaire consentant, entered production in 2022 for a planned release in 2023.

References

External links

21st-century Canadian screenwriters
Canadian screenwriters in French
Canadian women screenwriters
Canadian women film directors
Film directors from Quebec
Writers from Quebec
French Quebecers
Living people
Year of birth missing (living people)